The Ipswich–Ely line is a railway line linking East Anglia to the English Midlands via Ely. Passenger services are operated by Abellio Greater Anglia. It is a part of Network Rail Strategic Route 5, SRS 05.07, 05.08 and part of SRS 07.03. The line has previously been part of the Great Eastern Main Line.

History

Early history
The Eastern Union Railway (EUR) had built a line from Colchester to Ipswich and a number of directors from the EUR formed a new company, the Ipswich and Bury Railway, chaired by John Chevallier Cobbold to build a line from Ipswich to Bury St Edmunds which was known as the "Bury extension". It was granted parliamentary approval on 21 July 1845 and the first train ran on 26 November 1846. The stations at Bramford, Claydon, Needham, Stowmarket, Haughley Road, Elmswell and Thurston all opened on this date. Bury St Edmunds was served by a temporary station east of the current site with the main station opening in November 1847.

The Ipswich and Bury Railway was formally merged with the Eastern Union Railway on 9 July 1847.

The Newmarket Railway was built by the Newmarket and Chesterford Railway with the first section from Newmarket to meet the West Anglia Main Line at Great Chesterford opened in 1848.

In addition to the new line from Chesterford, the Newmarket Railway also stated constructing a line from Cambridge to Newmarket. The original route diverged form the main platform at Cambridge on a sharp curve and was the cause of operational difficulties for many years.

In July 1849 the Eastern Union Railway's extension to Norwich opened and a new station called Haughley was opened located just east of the junction. Haughley Road closed the same week.

The Newmarket Railway then intended building extensions through to Bury St Edmunds, Ely and Thetford and a parliamentary Act of 1847 gave approval for this. The Eastern Counties Railway (ECR), who ran the competing (and longer) route via Cambridge, Ely and Thetford, opposed this fearing a loss of Norwich traffic to this more direct route.  The ECR also operated the London Liverpool Street to Cambridge route at this time and were in a position to make things difficult for the Newmarket Railway which ceased operations in June 1850.

However, under the leadership of bankruptcy commissioner Cecil Fane, the company was re-established in September of the same year and instead the line from Six Mile Bottom to Cambridge was completed using the track from the Chesterford–Six Mile Bottom section. This line then opened on 9 September 1850 and the Chesterford route closed. Generally it is assumed the new stations at Fulbourne and Cherryhinton opened on the same date but Robertson, Wislon and Harley suggest that because they did not appear in the Bradshaws until the following August, that might be the correct date for those stations opening.

The Newmarket Railway then set its sights on building a line to Bury to link onto the EUR line (although the original plan was for a separate station) although the powers granted by the original act lapsed. The Newmarket Railway was in financial trouble and in 1852 the ECR was granted parliamentary permission to buy the Newmarket Railway. It completed this in 1854, the same year it also took over operation of the EUR.

Such was the enthusiasm for the railway, that the first sod was cut by the Newmarket Railway with great ceremony on 16 June 1852 before the necessary parliamentary powers had been granted. The line was completed early in 1854 and opened to traffic on 15 March of that year.

As well as new stations at Higham, Saxby & Risby and Kennett, a  tunnel was required through Warren Hill at Newmarket and the engine shed at Bury that originally stood at the west end of the branch from Ipswich, was resited to allow the opening of the new line. At Newmarket, trains from Cambridge arrived into the original 1848 terminus and would then reverse out before continuing the journey towards Bury St Edmunds (and they had to do the same in the opposite direction).

1854 also saw the closure of Cherryhinton station on 1 May.

Ely and Newmarket Railway and GER operation (1862–1922)
By the 1860s the railways in East Anglia were in financial trouble, and most were leased to the ECR; they wished to amalgamate formally, but could not obtain government agreement for this until 1862, when the Great Eastern Railway (GER) was formed by amalgamation. Thus the Ipswich to Cambridge line was operated by the GER from 1862.

In 1874 two rival schemes were put before Parliament. The Ely and Newmarket Railway (ENR) scheme was backed by the GER, whilst the other scheme – the Ely and Bury Light Railway – was to run via Soham and Mildenhall. Parliament approved the ENR scheme and granted running powers to the Ely and Bury Light Railway from Ely to Soham which was covered by the ENR proposal and their route could then be constructed from there to Bury St Edmunds. In the event nothing more came of this second scheme.

The line between Cambridge and Newmarket was doubled in 1875.

The ENR act was passed in 1875 and construction began soon after, under the guidance of engineer George Hopkins and contractor John Waddell.  Although an inaugural train carrying various GER officers ran on 6 June 1879, the line failed to pass the mandatory government inspection and it was not until 1 September that the line opened. The opening day was not auspicious, as a locomotive was derailed near Soham, without casualties. One of the first trains to use the new link was a train carrying racehorses from Newmarket to Doncaster.

From the outset the single track line was operated by the GER, and Fordham and Soham stations (both equipped with goods yards) all opened on 1 September 1879.

At the same time as the ENR line opened, a new low level island platform was  provided at Newmarket to remove the need for trains to reverse into and out of the old terminal station.  This station then primarily became a goods station, although it was used by passenger services on race days, and was linked to the new platform by a footbridge.  Provision for passengers on the new platform was not overgenerous at first, leading to a number of complaints in the local newspapers. The GER provided a waiting room in 1881.

There was still no direct line between Bury St Edmunds and Ely, so trains had to reverse in the Newmarket area. A link was provided with a new line between Chippenham Junction (west of Kennett) station and Snailwell Junction on the ENR opened on 1 September 1880. The GER built four cottages at Snailwell Junction in 1882 for local staff.

The GER started operating the "North Country Continental" train over the route between Parkeston and Manchester in 1883.

On 2 June 1884 Fordham became a railway junction when the first section of the Mildenhall branch opened. The line through to Mildenhall opened on 1 April 1885.

A new station to cater for racegoers was opened at Newmarket Warren Hill (just north of the tunnel) on 4 April 1885. This was primarily for people attending race meetings at Newmarket arriving from the north and east with those from the south using the original terminal station. Warren Hill was not a through station but a two-platformed terminus station with some associated carriage sidings.

On 4 January 1887 the ENR was leased to the GER and in 1898 was fully vested.

A new junction at Coldham Junction Cambridge was opened and the approach to Cambridge improved with the new arrangements coming into force on 17 May 1896.

The 1879 platform closed at this time.

London and North Eastern Railway (1923–1947)
Following the grouping of 1923 the lines became part of the London & North Eastern Railway.

Despite being a heavily used section of line it remained single until 1938 when the section between Soham and Snailwell Junction was doubled. This was fortuitous as the route carried significant traffic during the Second World War to the many airbases located in East Anglia. Indeed, it was one of these trains that was involved in the accident detailed below.

Between 1945 and 1948 Newmarket Warren Hill station was closed to passengers although it is believed the last train ran in August 1938. The platforms and sidings remained in situ.

British Railways (1948–1994)
In 1948 as a result of nationalisation of the railways the route became part of British Railways Eastern Region.

The Bury Free Press reported on 2 January 1959  that all local passenger services between Cambridge and Ipswich would now be operated by Diesel Multiple Units.

The Mildenhall branch closed in 1962 (Fordham to Mildenhall) and 1964 (Cambridge Barnwell Junction to Fordham) and this was followed by Fordham station on 13 September 1965 although freight traffic lasted a further year until 12 September 1966. Soham station also closed to passengers on 13 September 1965.

The sidings at Warren Hill were removed in the early 1960s although the platform remained until the 1980s.

Goods facilities were withdrawn from Dullingham and Saxham & Risby on 28 December 1964.

It is believed that the Warren Hill Junction–Snailwell Junction probably closed on this date as well with the cessation of passenger traffic although by this time Snailwell Junction signal box was only opened in the morning at this time and the evening Ely–Newmarket service had to reverse at Chippenham Junction as the direct route was not available. However the line may have survived for freight until 2 February 1966 which was when Warren Hill signal box closed, although with the line being singled at this time, whether any trains actually ran via the Warren Hill Junction to Snailwell Junction curve is unknown. Warren Hill Tunnel was only ever single track.

On 5 August 1966 the Suffolk Mercury reported that Barbara Castle, the Minister of Transport, had given approval for the closure of the stations at Fulbourne, Six Mile Bottom, Dullingham, Kennet, Higham, Saxham & Risby, Thurston and Elmswell. The closures were to take effect from 5 November that year but on 4 October it was announced that  Dullingham, Kennet, Thurston and Elmswell would remain open.

On 2 January 1967 Fulbourne, Higham, Six Mile Bottom and Saxby & Risby stations closed and the remaining minor stations became unstaffed with the introduction of conductor guard working.  On 21 February 1967 the last shunting horse to work on British Rail, "Charlie" at Newmarket retired.

Needham station was closed in 1967 but reopened in 1971 as Needham Market.

Newmarket Goods Yard was also closed on 2 February 1969 with Snailwell Junction Signal Box closing a week later.

Further line rationalisation took place in 1978 when on 1 October tokenless block working was introduced between Newmarket and Dullingham stations. Five years later in May 1983 the line between Dullingham and Coldham Lane Junction was singled leaving a  passing loop at Dullingham.

Although general goods services were withdrawn from Thurston in 1967 coal trains ran until early 1976 (usually the Bury st Edmunds diesel shunter worked this train). The yard was lifted on 1 June 1976.

Upon sectorisation in 1982 Provincial (renamed Regional Railways in 1989) became responsible for all local passenger services.

The privatisation era
In April 1994 Railtrack became responsible for the maintenance of the infrastructure. Railtrack was succeeded by Network Rail in 2002.

Passenger services have been operated by the following franchises:

 April 1994 – December 1996       Operated as a non-privatised business unit under the InterCity name
 January 1997 – March 2004       Anglia Railways – owned by GB Railways but bought out by FirstGroup in 2003 
 April 2004 – February 2012      National Express East Anglia
 February 2012 – present            Abellio Greater Anglia

Infrastructure
The line shares the route between Ipswich and Haughley Junction with the Great Eastern Main Line which is classified as primary line. The section between Haughley Junction and Ely is classified as secondary line with the Cambridge branch being classified as rural.

The line from Ipswich to Soham is double track with the remainder, plus the Cambridge branch, being single track (with a passing loop at ). It has a loading gauge of W10 between Ipswich and Ely with the Cambridge branch being W8.

Passenger services
The summer 2015 passenger services, both operated by Abellio Greater Anglia, are:
 Ipswich–Cambridge (hourly) 
 Ipswich–Peterborough (two-hourly)

Some services are extended to Harwich Parkeston Quay.

Proposed developments

The line between Soham and Ely will be doubled as part of the Felixstowe and Nuneaton freight capacity scheme.

In January 2013, Network Rail released a five-year upgrade plan, which included reopening Soham station as part of improvements to the Ipswich–Ely line. This station was approved in 2020, and opened on 13 December 2021.

It has long been envisaged that the Ipswich to Cambridge route would become part of the east–west rail scheme but it is unclear whether this will see double track laid throughout and through services from stations in the west of England such as Oxford operating.

Reopening of Cherry Hinton and Fulbourn stations was proposed by Cambridgeshire County Council in May 2013 as part of an infrastructure plan to deal with projected population growth up to 2050.

Incidents

Thurston 1850
On 4 October 1850 the locomotive due to work the 8:00 am departure from Bury had to be withdrawn from service due to a technical failure. The stationmaster at Bury knew an engine would be sent from Ipswich to investigate the situation (this being normal practice in the days before telegraph communication between stations).  To save time four horses were connected to the two-coach train to pull it along the line to meet the loco coming from Ipswich. To enable them to see the relief train at the earliest opportunity Bury Stationmaster Hartwell and a porter William Baldwin climbed on to the roof of the first carriage and they were joined at Thurston by stationmaster James Wolton.  Just east of Thurston station the horse drawn train met the relief engine and the horses were removed. The three men remained sitting on the carriage roof and a little further east the two stationmasters who had been facing Bury were hit by the bridge as the train passed under it. Wolton and Hartwell were killed whilst Baldwin survived.

Fulbourn 1862
There was a fatal accident involving a goods train one mile from the station.

Dullingham 1873
On 29 April 1873 the rear portion of the train ran away and came to a stand beyond Six-Mile Bottom station (the bottom of a gradient) because insufficient brakes had been pinned down by the guard. Fortunately there was no loss of life.

Fulbourn 1926
On 22 September 1936 an aeroplane made a forced landing on the railway line between Fulbourn and Six Mile Bottom. The Fulbourn signalman was instrumental in saving the life of the pilot.

East of Cambridge 1883
On 23 October 1883 a low-speed collision occurred at the junction where the double line from Newmarket became single track. The train from the Newmarket direction failed to stop at a ticket platform. The driver of the other train, seeing the collision was imminent, attempted to draw his train clear but to no avail. His was the only injury (a broken leg) as both trains were lightly loaded. The driver of the Newmarket train was blamed for the accident.

Thurston 1944
On 12 January 1944 a freight train service from Ipswich to Whitemoor hauled by USA Engine No. 2363 was approaching Thurston at 12:40 am when the crown of the steel firebox collapsed due to the shortage of water. The fireman H. W. Leek was blown from the footplate by the force of the explosion and suffered severe bruising, burns and shock whilst the driver W. Nicholls sustained serious injuries including a broken thigh and burns on his left side.

Soham 1944
The Soham rail disaster where an ammunition train exploded during World War II occurred on 2 June 1944.

Dullingham 1973
On 17 May 1973 two Class 31 locomotives struck a track machine killing the operator.

Freight train derailment 2007
All traffic on the line was suspended for six months following a freight train derailed on the bridge over the River Great Ouse between Ely and Soham on 22 June 2007. The bridge was severely damaged and closed to all traffic while it was rebuilt. Rail replacement buses operated between Bury St Edmunds, Ely, March, Whittlesey and Peterborough for the duration until the section of line re-opened on 21 December 2007. (See also Railways in Ely)

References

Rail transport in Suffolk
Rail transport in Cambridgeshire
Railway lines in the East of England
Standard gauge railways in England